is a Japanese bassist. To date, he has released a total of 37 albums as a member of Casiopea and Jimsaku and solo artist, and has also made 3 bass instructional videos.

History
Tetsuo Sakurai started playing bass when he was 13 years old.

In 1976, Sakurai, with Issei Noro, founded jazz fusion band Casiopea. He released 19 albums while in Casiopea but later left the band with Akira Jimbo in 1989 over musical differences. Both of them then went on to form a new jazz fusion supergroup, Jimsaku. Jimsaku was active for nine years, until 1998, when it was disbanded and both Sakurai and Jimbo went on to pursue individual solo careers.

Solo
Sakurai's third solo album TLM20, released in 2000, was recorded live in a concert with Casiopea members Issei Noro and Minoru Mukaiya, Akira Jimbo, and Kazuki Katsuta of Dimension. The fourth solo album Gentle Hearts, released in 2001, was recorded with Greg Howe & Dennis Chambers. The fifth solo album Cartas do Brasil was released in 2003 and was a vocal ballad cover album recorded in Rio de Janeiro with Djavan, Ivan Lins, and Rosa Passos. In 2004, Tetsuo toured with Greg & Dennis.  The following year, the tour live performances was released on DVD titled Gentle Hearts Tour 2004.

Sakurai is currently composing and playing his own music as a solo artist with domestic and foreign musicians.

Discography

Casiopea
Casiopea (1979)
Super Flight (1979)
Thunder Live (1980)
Make Up City (1980)
Eyes of the Mind (1981)
Cross Point (1981)
Mint Jams (1982)
4x4 (1982)
Photographs (1983)
Jive Jive (1983)
The Soundgraphy (1984)
Down Upbeat (1984)
Halle (1985)
Casiopea Live (1985)
Sun Sun (1986)
Casiopea Perfect Live II (1987)
Platinum (1987)
Euphony (1988)
Casiopea World Live '88 (1988)

Shambara
Shambara (1989)

Jimsaku
 Jimsaku (1990)
 45°C (1991)
 Jade (1992)
 Viva! (1992)
 100% (1993)
 Wind Loves Us (1993)
 Navel (1994)
 Blaze of Passion (1995)
 Best Selection (1995)
 Dispensation (1996)
 MEGA db (1997)
 JIMSAKU BEYOND (2021)

Solo
Dewdrops (1986)
A Gate of the 21st Century (1999)
TLM 20 ~ Live Memories of 20 years ~ (2000)
Gentle Hearts (2001)
Cartas do Brasil ~ブラジルからの手紙~ (2003)
Gentle Hearts Tour 2004 (2004)
My Dear Music Life (2009)
Vital World (2010)
Talking Bass (2012)
Nothin But the Bass (2015)

References

External links
Tetsuo Sakurai official site
Tetsuo Sakurai official MySpace

1957 births
Japanese bass guitarists
Jazz fusion bass guitarists
Japanese jazz bass guitarists
Living people
Musicians from Tokyo
Casiopea members